The events of the Equestrian at the 2005 Southeast Asian Games featured the equestrian discipline jumping. The discipline was divided into individual and team contests. It was the only event open to all genders.

The events were held at the Alabang Country Club, on the suburb area of Muntinlupa, Metro Manila, Philippines.

Medal table

Medalists

External links
Southeast Asian Games Official Results

2005 Southeast Asian Games events
2005
Equestrian sports competitions in the Philippines
2005 in equestrian